India and Pakistan have played test series from 1978 to 2006 as part of their long standing rivalry in field hockey. They played eight test series in this span out of which Pakistan won six, India won one and one was drawn. Out of 52 matches played Pakistan won 25, India won 16 and 11 were drawn. The goal aggregation so far is Pakistan 124 - 104 India). In 1998, each country hosted four matches out of which Pakistan won four, India won three and one was drawn. The last was played in 2006 with three matches in each nation. Pakistan won three matches while India won one and two were drawn.

Indo-Pak test series of field hockey was expected to restart from 2013 as declared by Hockey India. In 2004 test series both India and Pakistan used a foreign coach for the first time. Gehard Rach of Germany was coach for India while Roelant Oltmans of Netherlands was coach for Pakistan.

List of series 
Out of eight test series played between the two teams, Pakistan have won on six occasions and India once. One series ended in a draw. Of the total 52 matches played, Pakistan have won 25 times against India's 16, with 11 matches ending in draws.

Matches
Test series between India and Pakistan:

1978 Test Series

This series was of 4 matches out of which Pakistan won 3 and India won 1 and 0 were drawn. Overall Pakistan was the winner of this series.

1981 Test Series

This series was of 4 matches out of which Pakistan won 2 and India won 1 and 1 were drawn. Overall Pakistan was the winner of this series.

1986 Test Series

This series was of 7 matches out of which Pakistan won 2 and India won 3 and 2 were drawn. Overall India was the winner of this series.

1988 Test Series

This series was of 6 matches out of which Pakistan won 2 and India won 2 and 2 were drawn. Overall the series was drawn.

1998 Test Series

This series was of 8 matches out of which Pakistan won 4 and India won 3 and 1 were drawn. Overall Pakistan was the winner of this series.

1999 Test Series

This series was of 9 matches out of which Pakistan won 5 and India won 3 and 1 were drawn. Overall Pakistan was the winner of this series.

2004 Test Series

In this test series both India and Pakistan used a foreign coach for the first time. Gehard Rach of Germany was coach for India while Roelant Oltmans of Netherlands was coach for Pakistan. This series was of 8 matches out of which Pakistan won 4 and India won 2 and 2 were drawn. Overall Pakistan was the winner of this series.

2006 Test Series

This series was of 6 matches out of which Pakistan won 3 and India won 1 and 2 were drawn. Overall Pakistan was the winner of this series.

References

See also
 India–Pakistan field hockey rivalry

International field hockey competitions hosted by Pakistan
P
India–Pakistan field hockey rivalry